Elmer Lee (March 12, 1856 – June 13, 1945) was an American physician and advocate of natural hygiene and vegetarianism. He was the founder and editor of the health magazine Health Culture.

Biography 
Elmer Lee was born in Ohio in 1856; he graduated from Ohio Wesleyan University, in 1877, with an A.B.; Lee received his A.M. in 1880. He then moved to St. Louis, where he taught in public schools and worked in newspapers. Lee earned his M.D. from the Missouri Medical College (now the Washington University School of Medicine) in 1880 and his Ph.D. from Saint Louis University in 1886. He then moved to Chicago, where he lived for ten years. Lee studied cholera in Germany and Russia, living for a time in Saint Petersburg.

Lee started the healthy living magazine Health Culture in 1894; it heavily promoted a plant-based diet. Lee remained as editor for 23 years, before being succeeded by Arthur Vos; the magazine continued publishing until 1964. Lee moved to New York City in 1898. He was acting Assistant Surgeon in the Spanish–American War. On November 23, 1898, he testified before a commission investigating conduct in the war. In 1902, Lee patented a reservoir for dispensing liquid soap.

In 1908, Lee authored an article in The New York Times about the founding of a "Hospital of Hygiene". Lee started working as a naturopath in 1910 and developed a health movement known as the "hygienic system", inspired by Russel Trall. In the same year, Lee was the subject of an article by The New York Times, entitled "Dr. Lee pleads for better foods", in which he advocated for curing disease through a diet of "live organic plant-foods" and asserted that societal maladies, such as drunkenness, were due to people not following a sufficiently nutritious diet; this article has been described as the first known use of the phrase "plant-foods" to describe a vegetarian diet.

In 1910, Lee reprinted Rupert H. Wheldon's No Animal Food and Nutrition and Diet with Vegetable Recipes, one of the first British vegan recipe books; it included a quote from Lee, stating that a "Plant diet with butter, cream, milk, cheese, eggs, lard, fat, suet, or tallow added to it, is not vegetarian; it is mixed diet; the same in effect as if meat were used." Around 1921, Lee invented a plant milk, derived from oats and peanut meal.

Lee served as the Vice-President of the American Academy of Medicine and held offices in the American Medical Association and the American Social Science Association; he was on the advisory committee of the American Super-Race Foundation and worked as a lecturer for the New York Board of Education.

Lee retired around 1935 and donated his medical books to Ohio Wesleyan University. He died at Cincinnati Sanitarium, College Hill, Cincinnati, on June 13, 1945.

Selected publications

Gallery

References 

1856 births
1945 deaths
19th-century American inventors
19th-century American male writers
19th-century American physicians
20th-century American inventors
20th-century American male writers
20th-century American physicians
Alternative detoxification promoters
Alternative medicine activists
American eugenicists
American food writers
American health and wellness writers
American magazine editors
American magazine founders
American medical writers
American military personnel of the Spanish–American War
American nutritionists
American anti-vaccination activists
American vegetarianism activists
Anti-vivisectionists
Lecturers
Naturopaths
Ohio Wesleyan University alumni
Orthopaths
People from Piqua, Ohio
Pseudoscientific diet advocates
Saint Louis University alumni
Washington University School of Medicine alumni